The Clinical Social Work Journal is a quarterly, peer-reviewed academic journal that publishes articles, commentaries, and book reviews relevant to contemporary clinical social work practice, research, theory, and policy. It is currently published by Springer Science+Business Media. The editor-in-chief is Melissa D. Grady (Catholic University of America). The journal was established in 1973. According to the Journal Citation Reports, the journal has a 2020 impact factor of 1.787.

References

External links 
 

Sociology journals
Social work
Springer Science+Business Media academic journals
Quarterly journals
English-language journals
Publications established in 1973
Psychotherapy journals